Khuchap Monastery or Khujabi Monastery is a monastery dedicated to Our Lady of Iviron. It is situated in Privolnoye, a village in the Lori Province of Armenia, near the border with Georgia.

Despite its geographic circumstances, Georgian authorities maintain that the monastery is situated in the Marneuli Municipality near the village of Akhkerpi.

Apart from the main church, Khuchap Monastery also consists of a gavit and several ruined buildings.

References

Christian monasteries established in the 12th century
Christian monasteries established in the 13th century
Georgian Orthodox monasteries
Eastern Orthodox monasteries in Armenia
Religious sites in Georgia (country)